is a 1957 black-and-white Japanese film directed by Seijun Suzuki.

Cast 
 Michitaro Mizushima : Kensaku Maki
 Hiroshi Kondō
 Joe Shishido : Mizoguchi(Detective)
 Mari Shiraki
 Shinsuke Ashida : Shozan Kanda
 Hideaki Nitani : Yuzo Sugawa

References

External links 
 

Japanese black-and-white films
1957 films
Films directed by Seijun Suzuki
Nikkatsu films
1950s Japanese films